Yellow Flowers on the Green Grass is a 2015 Vietnamese film. It was adapted from the novel of the same name by Nguyễn Nhật Ánh. It was directed by Victor Vũ and produced by Galaxy Media & Entertainment Saigon Concert, Phương Nam Film, PS Việt Nam and  K+ Television channel. It was premiere in Cannes Film Festival 2015 and released in theaters on 2 October 2015. It was selected as the Vietnamese entry for the Best Foreign Language Film at the 89th Academy Awards but it was not nominated. On December 5 during the 19th Vietnam Film Festival, the movie was awarded the golden lotus (the most-honored award given to a Vietnamese movie)

Plot 

This is a movie portraying love and affection about a hometown, a family and teenage hood of each. Tường is an innocent and lovely boy while his brother Thiều is selfish and stubborn. Aside from brotherhood filled with love, hate, envy, regret and atonement,...this is also about friendship, childhood memory of children living in poverty in Middle Region of Vietnam during 80s. There are fights; interesting kids' games; dreams filled with the images of prince and princess, and their first crush...

The story is demonstrated from a diary of Thiều evolving his daily life and thoughts. Thiều is a seventh grader who lives in a poor countryside with his younger brother named Tường. Tường is a lovely, generous and nice boy who loves his brother a lot; he especially loves playing with animals including bugs even. He is an introvert and loves reading many books and folk tales, especially the story of Cóc Tía (Purple Toad), therefore he pets a toad under his bed and names it "Cu Cậu". On the other hand, Thiều is a mischievous, extroverted boy who has been unintentionally letting Tường take all the blame for his tricks. Although being selfish on the outside, deep down Thiều still loves his brother. The brothers often hang around playing many traditional games for kids and make many memories out of it. The story also broadens the relationship between the brothers and people in their village, including their classmates and families. Their father is described as a gentleman who is appreciated by many, yet he has a short temper and often beat the two brothers for some reasons, while their mother is a nice woman, but she scolds them for their mistakes regardless.

Uncle Đàn is the younger brother of Thiều's father who is handicapped yet still positive and often spares his time to tell some spooky stories for two brothers. His only sorrow must be his ill-fated love caused by losing one of his arms. Uncle Đàn loves Vinh, a girl who is the daughter of Thiều's scary teacher and also lives in the same village. One of Thiều's classmates is Sơn, who is 3 years older but still in the same class with Thiều due to his bad grades. Sơn is a muscular boy who is extremely naughty with much misbehavior. Later, Thiều comes to realize his crush for his classmate Mận. Mận is cute and innocent, but she doesn't study well enough because she has to take care of her sick father, who is locked inside a shack by her mother. Only Thiều and Tường know this secret as both have to fight against Sơn to protect Mận from evil plans.

The shack Mận's father is locked inside catches fire; her mother is arrested for capturing her husband who is assumed to have died during the fire as bones are discovered in the ash. Mận is shocked and completely devastated; Thiều's family decide to help her by telling her that she can live with them. Mận is aware of the fact that her father is still alive and her mother will be released soon. However, the friendship between Mận and Tường gradually makes Thiều jealous. He doesn't care enough to stop his brother's toad from being taken and killed for its meat. The incident haunts Thiều as he watches Tường mourn over the toad not knowing his big brother is partially responsible. The flood arrives and the village is drowned, once it withdraws, the village is left with poverty and a lack of crop. Thiều, Tường and Mận discover that Uncle Đàn and Vinh have already planned for an escape from their family. At the same time, Thiều's selfishness is getting bigger, which makes him hit Tường with a big stick of wood, leaving Tường paralyzed. Thiều feels even more regretful as Tường tells him that he is the one whom Mận would like to hang out with.

Cast 
 Thịnh Vinh as Thiều
 Trọng Khang as Tường
 Thanh Mỹ as Mận
 Mai Thế Hiệp as Mr. Nhãn
 Trương Tú Liên as Thiều's mother
 Lê Vinh as Thiều's father
 Anh Tú as Đàn
 Khánh Hiền as Vinh
 Mai Trần as Tám Tàng 
 Mỹ Anh as Nhi

Production and Release 
Director Viet Linh was ordered by Phuong Nam Films to write the script of the movie which was finished in 2013. The script was demonstrated from the same name novel of writer Nguyen Nhat Anh by Viet Linh, Victor Vu and Doan Nhat Nam altogether. The movie was mostly filmed at Phu Yen, some at Van Ninh Commune, Khanh Hoa Province and Ho Chi Minh City. The original title was "Hoa Vang Tren Co Xanh" (Yellow Flowers on Green Grass), this is the first movie which was not written by Victor Vu himself. The budget of the movie was nearly 20 billion VND. This is the first movie which is produced as a cooperation between national and private companies.

See also
 List of submissions to the 89th Academy Awards for Best Foreign Language Film
 List of Vietnamese submissions for the Academy Award for Best Foreign Language Film

References

External links
 

 YELLOW FLOWERS ON THE GREEN GRASS trên Fortissimo Films

2015 films
Works by Nguyễn Nhật Ánh
Films based on works by Vietnamese writers
Vietnamese musical films
Vietnamese teen films